The Evolution of Man is the fourth studio album by English musician Example, released on 19 November 2012 through Ministry of Sound.

Background and development
Example tweeted that on the plane to Sydney, he planned on writing some songs for a new album and he would be listening to Kasabian's album Velociraptor! for lyrical inspiration. Whilst in Australia for 2 months, the singer planned to write the entire album in the time he spent there.

On 25 July 2012 Example announced via Twitter that the name of the lead single from his fourth album was "Say Nothing" – produced by Dirty South, also revealing it would premiere Monday 30 July 2012 on Capital FM. The track, alongside "Perfect Replacement" (produced by Feed Me), received its live debut on 18–19 August 2012 at the V Festival.

After fans' complaints about the lack of dubstep influence in "Say Nothing", Example responded to a comment on Facebook, saying "wait for the album, I'm not gonna fill the album with the same sounding song, and I'm not gonna keep releasing the same 'dubstep' or 'electro' record".

The promotional video for "Come Taste the Rainbow" premiered on 19 October 2012 on Hunger TV. This was also uploaded later to Example's official YouTube channel.

"Close Enemies", produced by Alex Smith, was released as the second single from the album on 11 November 2012, entering the UK Singles Chart at No. 37.

On 15 November, Greg James at BBC Radio 1 had the exclusive first play of "Perfect Replacement", with Example claiming that he "wanted it to be a single" but that there were "five or six" tracks that could be chosen as the third single. On 24 November, Example confirmed "Perfect Replacement" as the third single. Previous tweets had hinted towards "Queen of Your Dreams" becoming a future single. During a live hangout on Google+, he revealed that he struggles to reach the high notes and so he doesn't perform "Queen of Your Dreams" live.

From 11 February to 1 March 2013, Example and his live band completed their second UK arena tour. He performed six tracks from The Evolution of Man along with songs from his previous two albums Playing in the Shadows and Won't Go Quietly. The band consists of Gleave, Sheldrake, Johnny "Drummachine" and Kaikai (who replaced David Stewart as guitarist). He was supported by Benga on all dates and Micky Slim, Sway, Baller B and P Money on selected dates.

Singles
"Say Nothing" is the album's lead single. It is produced by Dirty South, and was released on 16 September 2012. The single debuted at number 2 on the UK Singles Chart.
"Close Enemies" is the second single from the album. It is produced by Alex Smith, and was released on 11 November 2012. The single debuted at number 37 on the UK Singles Chart but debuted at number 7 on the UK Indie and dance.
"Perfect Replacement" is the third and final single from the album. It is produced by Feed Me and was released on 24 February 2013. The single peaked at number 46 on the UK Singles Chart but it peaked at number 7 on the UK Indie chart and number 9 on the UK Dance chart

Reception
The album received mostly mixed to positive reviews from music critics.

Track listing

Notes
 Track listing and credits from album booklet.
  signifies a co-producer
  signifies an additional producer
  signifies a remixer

Personnel

 Elliot Gleave – vocals

Production
 Adam "Calvin Harris" Wiles – producer, mixing (13)
 Adegbenga "Benga" Adejumo – producer, mixing (1)
 Alessandro "Alesso" Lindbald – producer, mixing (5)
 Alex Smith – producer, mixing, vocal engineer (2, 8)
 Andy Sheldrake – producer, mixing (10)
 Antoine "AN21" Josefsson – producer, mixing (16)
 Dillon Francis – producer, mixing (15)
 Dragan "Dirty South" Roganovic – producer, mixing (6, 7, 9)
 Ed "Friction" Keeley – producer, mixing (10)
 Graham Coxon – guitars (4, 6, 10)
 Johnny McDaid – writer, backing vocals (6)
 Jon "Feed Me" Gooch – producer, mixing, mastering, guitars, keyboards (3)
 Jon Moon – vocal engineer
 Joshua "Flux Pavilion" Steele – producer, mixing (18)
 Luke van Scheppingen – producer, mixing (17)
 Max Vangeli – producer, mixing (16)
 Mike Marsh – mastering
 Morten "Moám" Hampenberg – additional production
 Oliver "Skream" Jones – producer, mixing (12)
 Ollie Corneer – producer, mixing (14)
 Phil Faversham – mixing, programming, additional production, mastering
 Shawn "Neon Stereo" Mohammadi – vocal engineer
 Simon Davey – mastering
 Stefan Engblom – producer, mixing (14)
 Thomas "Tommy Trash" Olsen – producer, mixing (4)
 Tom Goss – guitars
 Wez Clarke – drums, programming, vocal producer, mastering
 Zane Lowe – producer, mixing (11)

Additional personnel
 Alex Jenkins – artwork

Charts

Weekly charts

Year-end charts

Release history

References

2012 albums
Example (musician) albums
Albums produced by Calvin Harris
Ministry of Sound albums